IFK Uddevalla Futsal is a Swedish futsal association. It was formed in 2013 in Uddevalla, Sweden, and they play their home games in Agnebergshallen.

IFK Uddevalla Futsal plays in the Swedish Futsal League, and has two second place finishes in 2015 and 2016 and one win in 2017. They hosted Swedish finals of futsal in 2016.

On February 25, 2017 Uddevalla set a new attendance record for the sport of Futsal in Sweden. 1754 people saw IFK Uddevalla Futsal take on Örebro SK in the Futsal Championships semi-final second leg in Agnebergshallen in Uddevalla. Half-time entertainment was Uddevalla's own Thomas Stenström, who is friends with many of the team.

On March 4, 2017 IFK Uddevalla wrote club history. The national final which was played against Borås AIK in Helsingborg Arena ended 6-4  to IFK, and resulted in the first national championship for them.

The club has several players in the Sweden national futsal team such as Marcus Gerd, Fredrik Söderqvist, Granit Berisha, Petrit Zhubi and Robert Bagger.

References

Futsal clubs in Sweden
Futsal clubs established in 2013
2013 establishments in Sweden